The A64 autoroute is a motorway in southwestern France.  It is also called the La Pyrénéenne and numbered the European route E80.  It is a toll road for part of its length.

Aligned East-West, it connects Toulouse to Bayonne via Tarbes and Pau. Its length is approximately 287 km with 2x2 lanes and 2x3 lanes towards Toulouse. It is operated by ASF.

Junctions

 01 km 11 Start of autoroute in junction with: RD1 to junction 5.1 of the A63 autoroute to Biarritz.    
 02 km 11 (Briscous) Towns served: Briscous   
 04 km 16 (Urt) Towns served: La Bastide-Clairence
 05 km 23 (Guiche) Towns served: Guiche    
 Péage de Sames
  Service Area: Hastingues     
 Exchange A64-A641 Junction with A641 spur to Peyrehorade.   
 07 km (Salies-de-Béarn) Towns served: Salies-de-Béarn    
 Rest Area: Magret     
  Rest Area: Haut de Départ     
 08 km  (Orthez) Towns served: Orthez    
 Service Area: Lacq-Audejos      
  09 (Artix) Towns served: Mourenx   
 10 (Pau) Towns served: Pau    
  Rest Area: Serres-Morlaàs     
 11 (Soumoulou) towns served:  Soumoulou, Nousty, Lourdes via RD940.   
 Service Area: Les Pyrénées     
 12 (Tarbes-ouest) Towns served: Tarbes, Lourdes via RN21     
 13 km 145 (Tarbes-est) Towns served: Tarbes    
 Rest area km 156 Bordes    
 14 (Tournay) Towns served:  Tournay, Bagnères-de-Bigorre   
 15 km 171 (Capvern) Towns served:  Capvern-les-Bains   
 Rest Area km 172: Les Bandouliers/Le Lac St-Martin     
 16 km 175 (Lannemezan) Towns served: Lannemezan    
 Rest area km 182: Le Pic du Midi     
 Exchange A64-A645 km 192 Junction with A645 spur to Montréjeau, Bagnères-de-Luchon, Aran Valley (Spain)
 Service Area: Comminges     
 18 km 207 (Saint Gaudens) Towns served: Saint-Gaudens
 Péage de Lestelle     
 19 km 218 (Lestelle de St-Martory) Towns served: Lestelle-de-Saint-Martory
 20 km 222 (Saint-Martory) Towns served: Saint-Girons, Saint-Martory   
 21 (Boussens) Towns served: Boussens, Martres-Tolosane    
 22 km 233 (Martres-Tolosane) Towns served: Martres-Tolosane    
 Rest Area km 237: Vergers/Bleue     
 23 km 240 (Cazères) Towns served: Cazères, Le Fousseret    
 24 km 244 (Lavelanet de Comminges) Towns served: Lavelanet-de-Comminges   
 25 (Saint Elix le Chateau) Towns served: Saint-Élix-le-Château    
 26 (Laffite Vigordane) Towns served: Lafitte-Vigordane, Carbonne    
 27 km 254.5 (Carbonne) Towns served: Carbonne    
 Service Area: km 257 Garonne/Volvestre     
 28 km 258 (Capens) Towns served: Capens    
 29 km 260 (Noé) Towns served: Noé    
 30 km 261.5 (Longages) Towns served: Lavernose-Lacasse   
 31 (Mauzac) Towns served: Mauzac    
 32 km 265 (Le Fauga) Towns served: Le Fauga    
 33 km 269 (Muret-Sud) Towns served: Muret    
 33 km 269 (Muret-Centre) Towns served: Muret, Rieumes via RD3     
 35 km 274 (Muret-nord) Towns served: Muret, Toulouse via RN117     
 Péage de Muret      
 36 km 281 (Roques) Towns served: RN264 and RN20 to Pamiers     
 37 km 283 (Francazal) Towns served: Toulouse     
 38 km 286 (Le Chapitre) Towns served: Toulouse    
 Exchange A64-A620 Autoroute joins the A620 the Périphérique of Toulouse

External links
 A64 Motorway on Saratlas

A64